Lento for Strings is an orchestral work by the Australian composer Malcolm Williamson.

History of the work
The brief but eloquent Lento for Strings was written in 1985, while the composer was in Australia. The work was commissioned by the Royal Melbourne Philharmonic, who premièred it in the autumn of that year in Melbourne, and Williamson chose to dedicate the piece to a longtime friend and champion, Paul McDermott. McDermott was held in particularly high regard by Williamson, especially as it was he who had successfully conducted his Symphony No. 6: Liturgy of Homage a few years before.

Structure
Firmly rooted in the key of F major, the stately theme is first played by the violins. After a short development section, the key changes to the relative major (D major, in this case) in a grand restatement of the original theme. The music returns to the opening key for the coda, where echoes of the theme are heard in the violas, with the slight harmonic alteration of the flatted sixth of the scale (D flat, in this case), a colouration which adds a certain poignancy to the final bars.

Orchestration
The Lento is scored for orchestral strings only, playing divisi most of the time.

Recordings
There are currently three recordings of the Lento available commercially. These are:

CHANDOS: Iceland Symphony Orchestra conducted by Rumon Gamba. (CHAN 1046)
CRESSIDIA CLASSICS: London Schubert Players, conducted by Alan Tongue. (CRES CD 196)
CARLTON CLASSICS: English Northern Philharmonia conducted by Alan Simmons (Carlton 8843818)

References
Notes

Sources

External links
 

Compositions by Malcolm Williamson
1985 compositions
Compositions for string orchestra
Contemporary classical compositions
Music commissioned by the Royal Melbourne Philharmonic